Sir Robert Christopher Stafford Stanley, KBE, CMG, OBE (12 May 1899 – 15 November 1983) was a British colonial administrator.

After serving as Chief Secretary of Northern Rhodesia, he was appointed High Commissioner of the Western Pacific in January 1952, although he did not arrive in Suva, Fiji, until June, taking up his duties on 3 July. He was the first person to hold the office separately from the Governor of Fiji, the two positions having been joined since 1877. After touring the British Western Pacific Territories, which included the Solomon Islands, New Hebrides, and the Gilbert and Ellice Islands in September, he moved the High Commission to Headquarters to Honiara in the Solomon Islands on 22 December. On 1 January 1953, he also became Governor of the Solomon Islands. He retired as High Commissioner and Governor in July 1955.

References

Governors of the Solomon Islands
High Commissioners for the Western Pacific
Members of the Legislative Council of Northern Rhodesia
Chief Secretaries of Northern Rhodesia
Governors of Northern Rhodesia
British expatriates in Zambia
British expatriates in Fiji
1899 births
1983 deaths